Sagna may refer to:
 Sagna, Neamț, a Romanian commune
 Dharyala Sagna, a town in Pakistan
 Sagna (surname)